Springfield Public Square Historic District is a national historic district located at Springfield, Missouri, United States. The district encompasses 27 contributing buildings, 1 contributing site, 1 contributing structure, and 2 contributing objects in Springfield's central business district. The district developed between about 1890 and 1959, and includes representative examples of commercial architecture. Located in the district are the separately listed Franklin Springfield Motor Co. Building, Gillioz Theatre, Heer's Department Store, Netter-Ullman Building, and Marx-Hurlburt Building.  Other notable resources include the Landers Building (1915), F. W. Woolworth Co. (1954), J. J. Newberry Co. (1951), S. S. Kresge Co. (1953), Springfield Cigar Company (c. 1890), Stancill Drug Store (c. 1890), National Shirt Co (c. 1952), Salvation Army (c. 1890), Public Square (c. 1835, 1970), Queen City Bank (1914), Frisco Office Building  (1910), and Cantrell Building (c. 1927).

It was added to the National Register of Historic Places in 2006 with a boundary increase in 2010.

References

Historic districts on the National Register of Historic Places in Missouri
Buildings and structures in Springfield, Missouri
National Register of Historic Places in Greene County, Missouri